Chinese musical instruments were traditionally classified according to the materials used in their construction.  The eight classifications are silk, bamboo, wood, stone, metal, clay, gourd, and hide. There are other instruments that may not fit these classifications. 

Silk instruments are mostly string instruments (including plucked, bowed, and struck). Since the very beginning, the Chinese have used silk for strings, though today metal or nylon are more frequently used.

Bamboo mainly refers to woodwind instruments.

Most wood instruments are of the ancient variety.

The full list of these categories is wood, stone, bamboo, bone, silk, skin, plant and metal 

The "stone" category contains various forms of stone chimes.

See also
List of traditional Chinese musical instruments

Chinese musical instruments